Juan Guillermo Brunetta (born August 25, 1975, in Laboulaye, Córdoba) is an Argentine professional racing cyclist. He is most famous for his unusual size for a cyclist. Like most cyclists out of Córdoba, he started off as a track rider but has made the transition to the road and does not race as much on the track these days. He has been one of the best time trialists for the last 6 years in Argentina, but he has raced most of his road career in Uruguay with the Villa Teresa team with much success, especially in the time trials. He competed in the men's team pursuit at the 2000 Summer Olympics. Since 2007 he has been racing in Argentina again.

Career highlights

2000
 1st, Stage 5, Vuelta a la Argentina
2001
  National Championships, Road Race
 2nd Pan American Championships, Track, Individual Pursuit, Medellín, Colombia
2002
  National Championships, Individual Time Trial
 2nd, Overall, Vuelta a San Juan
 1st, Stage 8B, Vuelta Ciclista de Chile
 1st, Stage 6A, Clásica del Oeste-Doble Bragado
2003
  National Championships, Track, Individual Pursuit
  National Championships, Individual Time Trial
  in Pan American Games, Track, Team Pursuit, Santo Domingo (DOM)
2004
  National Championships, Individual Time Trial
  National Championships, Track, Individual Pursuit
 1st, Stage 4, Vuelta de San Juan
 1st, Overall, Giro del Sol
 1st, Stage 2
2005
 3rd Pan American Championships, Individual Time trial in Mar del Plata, Argentina
  National Championship, Individual Time trial
  National Championship, Track, Madison with Jorge Ruschansky
  National Championship, Track, Individual Pursuit
2006
 1st, Stage 1 & 9, Rutas de America
 3rd, Overall, Vuelta Ciclista del Uruguay
1st, Stage 8
2007
  National Championship, Individual Time trial
 2nd National Championship, Track, Individual Pursuit
  National Championship, Track, Team Pursuit with the Cordoba Track Team
  National Championship, Track, Madison with Sebastian Cancio
 1st, Stage 8B, Rutas de America
2008
 1st, Stage 8, Vuelta a San Juan
 2nd, Stage 3, Tour de San Luis
 2nd, Overall, Clásica del Oeste-Doble Bragado
 1st, Stage 6A

References

External links

1975 births
Living people
Argentine male cyclists
Argentine track cyclists
Cyclists at the 1999 Pan American Games
Cyclists at the 2003 Pan American Games
Sportspeople from Córdoba Province, Argentina
Pan American Games medalists in cycling
Pan American Games silver medalists for Argentina
Olympic cyclists of Argentina
Cyclists at the 2000 Summer Olympics